Habib Abu Shahla ( / Ḥabīb Abū Shahlā, also spelled Abou Chahla) or Abi Shahla ( / Abī Shahlā, also spelled Abi Chahla; 1902 – 22 March 1957) was a Lebanese politician and public figure, several times member of Parliament. He hailed from an Orthodox family. Abu Shahla had studied at the American University of Beirut and at the University of Paris. He was the minister of justice in 1943 and the minister of education and Deputy Prime Minister of Lebanon between 1943 and 1945 and the speaker of the Lebanese Parliament between 1946 and 1947. 

A street bears his name and a statue of him stands in Beirut.

See also
 List of speakers of the Parliament of Lebanon

References

1902 births
1957 deaths
Deputy prime ministers of Lebanon
Justice ministers of Lebanon
American University of Beirut alumni
Lebanese expatriates in France
Legislative speakers of Lebanon
Politicians from Beirut
University of Paris alumni
Eastern Orthodox Christians from Lebanon

National Bloc (Lebanon) politicians